The Arizona State Sun Devils men's ice hockey statistical leaders are individual statistical leaders of the Arizona State Sun Devils men's ice hockey program in various categories, including goals, assists, points, and saves. Within those areas, the lists identify single-game, single-season, and career leaders. The Sun Devils represent Arizona State University as in independent in the NCAA.

Arizona State began competing in intercollegiate ice hockey in 2015.  These lists are updated through the end of the 2020–21 season.

Goals

Assists

Points

Saves

References

Lists of college ice hockey statistical leaders by team
Statistical